Monze District is a district of Zambia, located in Southern Province. The capital lies at Monze. As of the 2000 Zambian Census, the district had a population of 163,578 people.

References

 
Districts of Southern Province, Zambia